A.S. Pushkin Brest State University is an institution of higher education in Brest, Belarus. Founded in 1945 as the Brest State Teachers' Training Institute, it was reorganised into Brest State Pedagogical Institute in 1950 and eventually into a university in 1995.

External links
 website of the A.S. Pushkin Brest State University

Universities in Belarus
Buildings and structures in Brest, Belarus
Educational institutions established in 1945
1945 establishments in Belarus